Alexander Aloysius "Alan" McGuckian SJ (born 26 February 1953) is a Roman Catholic prelate and theologian from Northern Ireland who has served as Bishop of Raphoe since 2017.

Early life and education
McGuckian was born on 26 February 1953 in Cloughmills, County Antrim, the youngest of six children to Brian McGuckian and his wife Pauline (née McKenna). His father was a successful pig farmer who, alongside his brothers, developed the world's biggest pig farm. Two of this brothers are also Jesuit priests, while another brother is a businessman and both of his sisters have predeceased him.

He attended primary school in Cloughmills and secondary school at St MacNissi's College, before beginning studies in Irish and scholastic philosophy at Queen's University, Belfast in 1971, where he was a near-contemporary of future brother bishop Dónal McKeown. McGuckian first visited Ranafast in 1968, and has since become a regular visitor to the Donegal Gaeltacht.

After one year in Belfast, McGuckian entered the Jesuit novitiate at Manresa House in Clontarf, Dublin, during which time he completed a Bachelor of Arts in Latin and Spanish from University College Dublin between 1974 and 1977, a Bachelor of Philosophy from Milltown Institute of Theology and Philosophy between 1977 and 1979, and a Master of Divinity and a Licentiate of Sacred Theology from Regis College, Toronto between 1981 and 1985. He subsequently completed a Master of Arts in Irish translation from Queen's University, Belfast.
 
He was ordained to the priesthood on 22 June 1984 and made his final profession on 15 February 1997.

Religious ministry 
Following ordination, McGuckian spent four years as a teacher in Clongowes Wood College and vocations director for the Jesuits, before undertaking a six month period of spiritual renewal in southern India and serving in a shanty town in Quezon City, Philippines.

He returned to Ireland in 1992, where he was appointed director of the Jesuit Communication Centre, during which he developed Sacred Space, a website which allowed people to pray at their computer, in 1999, and Catholic news service CatholicIreland.net in 2004.

McGuckian also served as editor of both An Timire and Foilseacháin Ábhair Spioradálta, later translating the autobiography of Ignatius of Loyola into Irish under the title Scéal an Oilithrigh. He also co-authored the drama 1912 - A Hundred Years On with Presbyterian historian Philip Orr in 2011, which looked at the experiences of the Ulster Covenant and the wider Home Rule movement from both nationalist and unionist perspectives.

McGuckian also served as chaplain to many of the Gaelscoileanna in the Diocese of Down and Connor, and subsequently as chaplain to Ulster University campuses in Belfast and Jordanstown. Following the publication of the Living Church Report, which outlined the findings of a synodal process within the diocese, he was appointed by Noël Treanor in 2012 to set up and lead the Living Church Office, whose aim was to realise the hopes and aspirations expressed in the report and subsequently in the upcoming diocesan pastoral plan.

McGuckian was also appointed diocesan director of formation for the permanent diaconate in 2014, and also worked during his directorship of the Living Church Office to establish pastoral communities across the diocese, through fostering a culture of co-responsibility for the mission of the Church between clergy and lay people.

Episcopal ministry
McGuckian was appointed Bishop-elect of Raphoe by Pope Francis on 9 June 2017. His appointment made him the first member of the Jesuits to be appointed a bishop in Ireland.

McGuckian was consecrated by the Archbishop of Armagh and Primate of All Ireland, Eamon Martin, on 6 August in the Cathedral of St Eunan and St Columba, Letterkenny. He uses the name and title Alan Mac Eochagáin, C. Í. when ministering in the Gaeltacht.

In an interview with The Irish Catholic in September 2019, McGuckian said that having a home is as fundamental as the right to life and education, and that the Government must be "pushed" to enshrine a right to housing in the Constitution of Ireland. He also joined a number of church leaders in the West of Ireland on 16 September 2021, in calling on the Irish government to offer reparations to homeowners whose properties were affected by defective concrete blocks.

In an interview with The Irish Catholic in February 2021, McGuckian took issue with the view held by political leaders that public worship was deemed to be "non-essential" during the COVID-19 pandemic in the Republic of Ireland. Quoting Pope Francis, who stated that "the right to worship must be respected, protected and defended by civil authorities like the right to bodily and physical health", he expressed a need to let political leaders know that public worship was not only central, but also "utterly essential".

Following a fatal explosion in Creeslough, County Donegal, on 7 October 2022, McGuckian referred to the explosion as "the darkest day in Donegal", adding that the local community was "living through a nightmare of shock and horror". He also concelebrated at the Funeral Masses of each of the victims, describing the fact that the parish church would be holding two funerals in the space of three hours as "surreal".

References

External links 

 Bishop Alexander Aloysius (Alan) McGuckian on Catholic-Hierarchy.org
 Bishop Alexander Aloysius McGuckian on GCatholic
 Bishop McGuckian, SJ on Diocese of Raphoe

Living people
21st-century Roman Catholic bishops in Ireland
20th-century Irish Jesuits
Alumni of Milltown Institute of Theology and Philosophy
Alumni of University College Dublin
Alumni of Queen's University Belfast
Roman Catholic bishops of Raphoe
People from County Antrim
1953 births
Jesuit bishops
21st-century Irish Jesuits